The British Academy Television Award for Best Entertainment Programme is one of the major categories of the British Academy Television Awards (BAFTAs), the primary awards ceremony of the British television industry. According to the BAFTA website, the category "includes quizzes, game shows, talent shows, music specials and all general entertainment programmes."

The category has been through several name and category changes:
 From 1958 to 1070 it was presented as an individual award named Best Light Entertainment. 
 In 1971 the name was changed to Best Light Entertainment Programme and in 1992 it was changed again to Best Light Entertainment Programme or Series.
 Since 2000 the category is presented under the name of Best Entertainment Programme.

Winners and nominees

1950s
Best Light Entertainment

1960s
Best Light Entertainment

1970s
Best Light Entertainment

Best Light Entertainment Programme

1980s
Best Light Entertainment Programme

1990s
Best Light Entertainment Programme

Best Light Entertainment Programme or Series

2000s
Best Entertainment Programme

2010s

2020s

References

External links
List of winners at the British Academy of Film and Television Arts

Entertainment Programme